Events from the year 1650 in Ireland.

Events
March 27 – Confederate Ireland's besieged capital Kilkenny is surrendered to Cromwell.
April 27 – Cromwellian conquest of Ireland: Oliver Cromwell joins the siege of Clonmel in person.
May 1 – Charles II repudiates his alliance with Irish Catholics in favour of one with Scottish Covenanters in the Treaty of Breda. Most English Royalists in Ireland surrender to the Parliamentarians after this point.
May 10 – Battle of Macroom: Irish force defeated by English Parliamentarians.
May 17 – Siege of Clonmel: Cromwell's troops storm the walls, taking up to 2,500 casualties. Although they are unable to take the town by force, the garrison, without supplies, slips away under cover of darkness.
May 26 – Cromwell leaves Ireland from Youghal and passes his command to Henry Ireton.
June 19 – Battle of Tecroghan: an Irish force successfully relieves the siege of Tecroghan Castle in County Westmeath
June 21 – Battle of Scarrifholis: the Irish Catholic Ulster Army is routed by the English Parliamentarians under Charles Coote, near Letterkenny, with up to 3,000 dead.
October 25 – Battle of Meelick Island: English Parliamentarians rout the Irish Connaught Army. 
December – The Duke of Ormonde, erstwhile Royalist commander in Ireland, gives up his command and leaves for France.

Arts and literature
Andrew Marvell writes An Horatian Ode upon Cromwell's Return from Ireland.

Births
May – William King, Church of Ireland Archbishop of Dublin and author (d.1729)

Deaths
May 11 – Boetius MacEgan, Catholic Bishop of Ross, hanged by the English Parliamentarians after the Battle of Macroom.
July 21 – Henry O'Neill, son of Owen Roe O'Neill, executed by the English Parliamentarians after the Battle of Scarrifholis.
July – Heber MacMahon, Roman Catholic Bishop of Clogher, executed by English Parliamentarian forces under Charles Coote (b.1600)

References

 
1650s in Ireland
Ireland
Years of the 17th century in Ireland